Sainte-Madeleine is a village municipality in southwestern Quebec, Canada in Les Maskoutains Regional County Municipality. The population as of the Canada 2011 Census was 2,356.

Le Camping Ste-Madeleine, founded in 1967 for visitors to EXPO 67, is the area's principal tourist attraction. The annual musical event, the Festival Country du Camping Sainte-Madeleine, held in late July, attracts approximately 5,000 visitors to the community of 2,356.

Individuals born in Sainte-Madeleine include artist France Jodoin.

Demographics 

See also
List of village municipalities in Quebec

References

External links

Villages in Quebec
Incorporated places in Les Maskoutains Regional County Municipality